Kim David Smith (born  is an Australian Helpmann Award-nominated singer and cabaret performer, known for performing Weimar-era inspired works that juxtapose authentic musical material with stylistic takes on current popular tunes. His recordings include electropop albums Nova and Supernova, written by Charlie Mason, and released by Ninthwave Records. Smith's solo cabaret program Morphium Kabarett enjoyed an acclaimed 2016 residency at Pangea in the East Village, Manhattan. Smith's debut cabaret album, Kim David Smith Live at Joe's Pub, was released Friday, July 17, 2020.

Smith studied Music Theatre at the Ballarat Arts Academy in Australia (BA, Music Theatre), and resides in New York City.

In 2009 Smith was presented with the Back Stage Bistro Award for Special Achievement as an Outstanding Performer (honored alongside Liza Minnelli and Charles Aznavour). He was also nominated for 2009, 2010, 2011, 2012, and 2019 Manhattan Association of Cabaret (MAC) Awards in the Male Vocalist category. In 2015, he was invited to be part of the concert celebrating the 100th birthday of Édith Piaf at The Town Hall in New York City, produced by Daniel Nardicio.

Smith portrayed the Emcee in Hunter Foster's production of Cabaret at the Cape Playhouse in Dennis, Massachusetts, in 2016, and played Salome in Tristan Divincenzo's production of Oscar Wilde's Salome at the Provincetown Theater in 2017.

Smith debuted Kim Sings Kylie, his musical salute to fellow Australian Kylie Minogue, at Joe's Pub at the Public Theater on 25 June 2018 for New York City Pride. Kim Sings Kylie performed in Sydney, Australia at the inaugural Sydney Cabaret Festival in July 2019.

Smith's Christmas cabaret, A Wery Weimar Christmas, debuted at Club Cumming December 16, 2019, and his Marlene Dietrich-inspired program, Mostly Marlene, debuted at Club Cumming on March 3, 2020.

A Wery Weimar Christmas returned to Club Cumming December 16 and 18, 2020, in a streamed, virtual performance produced by Club Cumming Productions, and featured special guest performances from Alexis Michelle, Boy Radio, and Natalie Joy Johnson. Longtime music collaborator Tracy Stark musically directed.

Mostly Marlene was featured in Alan Cumming's Adelaide Cabaret Festival program, performing June 24 and 25, 2021.

References

External links

"Kim Smith's Jealous Video Showcases Aussie 'Neo-Weimar, Cabaret-Pop' Star's Talents", The Huffington Post, 2 February 2016

Australian male singers
Australian cabaret performers
Australian expatriate male actors in the United States
Expatriate musicians in the United States
LGBT cabaret performers
Living people
Year of birth missing (living people)
Place of birth missing (living people)
Australian LGBT singers
Gay musicians